United States v. Park, 421 U.S. 658 (1975), was a case in which the Supreme Court of the United States held that the Food and Drug Administration (FDA) could pierce the corporate veil. The defendant, Park, was the CEO of Acme International. Park had failed to comply with a mandate from the FDA, under the Federal Food, Drugs, and Cosmetics Act, to keep conditions within his warehouses legally sanitary.

In the case, the Court found Park strictly liable for the unsanitary conditions that his company had created, arguing for strict liability under the rationale that the Federal Food, Drugs, and Cosmetics Act was a 'public welfare' statute. The Court concluded that as a welfare statute, the purpose was to prevent egregious social harm; therefore, the Defendant could be held strictly liable for the crime. 

The Court held that if someone were to willingly be in charge of a company, and therefore its problems, then he or she willingly accepts the consequences of any illegal practices that his or her company or organization is involved in. An exception is made if the problem is impossible to fix.

See also
 List of United States Supreme Court cases
 Lists of United States Supreme Court cases by volume
 List of United States Supreme Court cases by the Burger Court
 United States v. Dotterweich

External links

Food and Drug Administration
United States Supreme Court cases
United States Supreme Court cases of the Burger Court
1975 in United States case law